The Angels in the Outfield franchise consists of American comedy-sports films, centered around the premise and original story written by Richard Conlin. The series of films include the 1951 original film, a 1994 remake and its two made-for-television sequels which were subsequently released straight-to-home video. Each installment depicts the fictional events of struggling sports teams, who receive help from heavenly messengers, and ultimately overcome their pitfalls. The sporting events depicted in the films, include Major League Baseball and High School Football. The plot depicts the development of character and spiritual growth, that comes with the help of angels.

The critical response for the original film, and its remake received mixed-to-positive and a less-than-positive response from critics, respectively. The latter's following two sequels, were met with poor critical reception. Despite this, the 1951 release is regarded as a classic film, while Angels in the Outfield (1994) has subsequently gained a cult childhood classic status, and is ranked No. 9 on The Wrap list of the twenty highest-grossing movies based on baseball.

Films

Angels in the Outfield (1951)

A newspaper reporter name Jennifer Paige investigates the MLB Pittsburgh Pirates' losing streak. The progress of the team is at a stand still, led by field manager "Guffy" McGovern, whose swearing and fighting further hinder their potential. An orphan named Bridget White has been praying for the team in the meantime. Her pleas are answered, when the voice of an angel urges McGovern to be kinder. In doing so, the angelic voice promises to help the Pirates finally win. During the playoffs the manager's temper is further tested, but McGovern seeks to help his team by keeping his promise with the heavenly messenger.

Angels in the Outfield (1994)

A foster-kid Roger Bomman loves the MLB California Angels, though they continue to be the worst team in the league. His estranged birth-father flippantly promises to reunite the family if the Angels make it to the World Series, with no intention of doing so. Roger resolves to ask God for some divine help, and prays that the team can turn things around. Soon thereafter, an angel from heaven named Al descends in response to the boy's plea and agrees to help the team so that the Roger can regain a family. California's hopeless coach, George Knox, is surprised when he sees he's team on achieve victory. Knox is not amused when Roger tells him the truth, that messengers from heaven are assist the team. When the team miraculously reaches the finals of the World Series, Knox begins to believe in the heavenly aid. Roger's father never returns to retrieve him. With Knox's job on the line, the urgency of the matter intensifies when the team struggles in the early innings of the final game. Together they learn that the spirits cannot and will not help the team in the last game of the Series, and hope for the team to rise above its follies.

Angels in the Endzone (1997)

The Westfield High School Angels football team have yet to win a game, in the last decade. Jesse Harper the team's halfback is a rising star, and gives the team hope in the upcoming season. This changes when after a severe rainstorm, Jesse's father dies in a motor vehicle accident. Saddened by these events, Jesse quits the team. Realizing that football gave Jesse purpose and motivation, his younger brother Kevin prays for help. Al the Angel returns to again to help the family with their loss, specifically focusing on Jesse. The angel assists the team in ending their losing streak, and seeks to change the lives of these brothers who suffer and struggle at the loss of their father.

Angels in the Infield (2000)

A past their prime MLB Anaheim Angels Pitcher named Eddie "Steady" Everett, makes a mistake when pitching to Randy Fleck in the crucial game of a series against the Boston Red Sox. Following these events, he threw away both his career and his personal life. In the process, he loses his family. Though his wife divorces him, his young daughter named Laurel still believes in him. After asking in prayer that God's help find her father, her personal guardian angel named Bob descends from heaven to help the family. Bob "Bungler" Bugler, a former MLB Pitcher himself, seeks to restore the confidence in Everett, help him recover from his career slump, assist the Anaheim Angels in regaining their winnings, and solve Laurel's struggles in ballet. After helping Eddie retain his position right as he was about to be cut from the roster, the team proceeds to attain an incredible winning streak. As the season ends, the Anaheim Angels are forced to play a single-elimination tournament in a postseason game against their rivals: the Arizona Crimson Devils. Though the heavenly messengers cannot and will not help the baseball team win the final game, the devil strikes a deal with the Crimson Devil's rising star, Randy Fleck. When the game is delayed due to rain Everett, who has come to value his relationship with his family, leaves to attend Laurel's ballet performance. Upon returning to the game, Everett finds that his team is losing 2–0. Knowing that the angelic team won't be assisting Anaheim's ball game, Everett feels lost and asks God what is to be done. On the Pitcher's mound, Bob whispers into his ear that Everett's angel is with him just as his ex-wife arrives to the game to support him. He realizes his family is most important, and finds strength within to continue the game.

Main cast and characters

Additional crew and production details

Reception

Box office and financial performance

Critical response

Notes

References 

Film franchises